Li Hailong (born 2 August 1996) is a Chinese footballer who currently plays as a defender for Shandong Taishan in the Chinese Super League.

Club career
Li Hailong was sent to Portugal for further training by Chinese Super League side Shandong Luneng (now renamed Shandong Taishan) in 2014. He joined Campeonato de Portugal side Sacavenense in the summer of 2014 and played in both senior team and U-19 team. On 12 February 2015, he made his senior debut in a 3–1 home win against Pinhalnovense. Li moved to another Campeonato de Portugal club Torreense in January 2016. He made his debut for Torreense on 21 February 2016 in a 0–0 draw against Eléctrico, coming on as a substitute for Yang Ailong in the 65th minute.

Li returned to Shandong Luneng and was promoted to the first team squad by Felix Magath in July 2016. On 24 July 2016, he made his debut for Shandong in a 1–0 home defeat against Shanghai Shenhua, coming on for Qi Tianyu in the 62nd minute. He would be used as a consistent squad player within the team and would gain his first league title with the club when he was part of the team that won the 2021 Chinese Super League title. This would be followed up by him winning the 2022 Chinese FA Cup with them the next season.

Career statistics 
Statistics accurate as of match played 31 January 2023.

Honours

Club
Shandong Luneng/ Shandong Taishan
Chinese Super League: 2021
Chinese FA Cup: 2020, 2021, 2022.

References

External links
 

1996 births
Living people
Chinese footballers
Footballers from Shandong
People from Linyi
S.C.U. Torreense players
Shandong Taishan F.C. players
Segunda Divisão players
Chinese Super League players
Association football defenders
Chinese expatriate footballers
Expatriate footballers in Portugal
Chinese expatriate sportspeople in Portugal
Footballers at the 2018 Asian Games
Asian Games competitors for China